KXXO (96.1 FM, "KXXO Mixx 96.1") is a radio station broadcasting an adult contemporary format. Licensed to Olympia, Washington, United States, it serves the Tacoma, Olympia, Puyallup, Centralia, Chehalis, and Shelton area.  The station is currently owned by 3 Cities.

External links

XXO
Radio stations established in 1986
1986 establishments in Washington (state)